Orocrambus sophronellus is a moth in the family Crambidae. This species is endemic to New Zealand. This species has been classified as Data Deficient by the Department of Conservation.

Taxonomy 
This species was first described by Edward Meyrick in 1885, from a specimen given to him by Richard William Fereday. Meyrick named the species Crambus sophronellus.  Meyrick gave a more detailed description of the species later that year. In 1928 George Vernon Hudson also described and illustrated the species. In 1975 David E. Gaskin placed the species in the genus Orocrambus. Gaskin argues that Hudsons illustration in his 1928 book is actually of the species O. cyclopicus. The type locality of the specimen is uncertain but is possibly Canterbury. The type specimen is held at the Natural History Museum, London.

Description 
Meyrick described the species as follows:

Distribution 
This species is endemic to New Zealand. It has been recorded in Taparewa near Nelson, the Mackenzie Basin, and Central Otago. It is possibly also present in Canterbury.

Life cycle and behaviour 
Adult moths have been recorded on wing in March. The species is attracted to light.

Habitat 
O. sophronellus is thought to occur in short tussock grasslands.

Host species
O. sophronellus is associated with Carex muelleri.

Conservation status 
This moth is classified under the New Zealand Threat Classification system as being Data Deficient.

References

External links
Image of female holotype specimen
Image of male and female species
Specimen held by Auckland War Memorial Museum

Crambinae
Moths described in 1885
Moths of New Zealand
Endemic fauna of New Zealand
Taxa named by Edward Meyrick
Endangered biota of New Zealand
Endemic moths of New Zealand